Main Aur Mr. Riight is a 2014 Indian romantic drama directed by Adeeb Rais. The film stars Barun Sobti and Shenaz Treasurywala as the lead pair. Main Aur Mr. Riight  tells the story of a single girl in search of her Mr. Right. The film was released on 12 December 2014.

Plot
Alia Raj is a popular casting director in Mumbai, who believes she has the perfect life, perfect friends, and perfect personality, and therefore needs the perfect guy, Mr. Right. All of her friends are in committed relationships, dating, engaged and married, and are constantly trying to match make for her. Sick of her friends trying to control her life, Alia decides to take things into her hands. Here enters Sukhwinder Singh, born in Punjab and raised in Delhi, is an aspiring actor who has not gotten his break in movies yet. Alia pays Sukhi to play the role of a guy named Vridhaan Dalmia, her version of Mr. Right, to get her friends off her back. Sukhi, who is the complete opposite of Alia, takes time into getting into the role, but eventually wins the heart of all of Alia's friends and even becomes friends with Alia. Alia's friend Abhay, who is dating the gold digger Diya, reveals he has feelings for Alia, and Alia decides to choose Abhay. Sukhi, who has developed feelings for Alia gets depressed and goes away. The rest of the story is about how Alia discovers her feelings for Sukhi and realizes that Mr. Right is not always who you think it is supposed to be.

Cast
Barun Sobti as Sukhwinder Singh aka Sukhi/Vridhaan Dalmia
Shenaz Treasurywala as Aliya Raj
Kavi Shastri
Danny Sura
Maia Sethna
Anagha Mane
Varun Khandelwal
Neha Gosai
Charlotte Wijlhuizen

Tracks

Reception
Shubhra Gupta of The Indian Express gave the film 1.5 stars out of 5, writing "Varun Sobti gets the hungry-actor look right, but the smiley Shenaz Treasurywala needed to be deeper" The Hindu wrote "A livewire, Shehnaz has finally got a film to showcase her talent and she doesn’t disappoint as the prim and proper girl who feels she is sorted but is actually not. She fumbles when the character demands more depth but is consistently fun to watch. Barun is not bad either but they have been saddled with a material that has long lost its bite. Even the tribute to Anil Kapoor-Amrtia Singh starrer "Pya Bina Chain Kahan Re" (Saheb) fail to generate goose bumps. It only makes you miss an era when even tripe was stirred well." Paloma Sharma of Rediff.com gave the film half star out of 5, writing "Barun Sobti fares better than his costars in the acting department. Main aur Mr Riight is a tad too pretentiously philosophical to be taken seriously." Bollywood Hungama gave the film 1.5 stars out of 5, writing "On the whole, MAIN AUR MR. RIIGHT can be avoided without any regrets.

References

External links
 

2014 films
2010s Hindi-language films
2014 romantic comedy films
Indian romantic comedy films
Films scored by Bappi Lahiri